Hirons is a surname. Notable people with the surname include:
 Caroline Hirons - British beauty and skincare queen
Frederic Charles Hirons (1882–1942), American architect
John Hirons (1876–after 1905), British footballer 
William Hirons (1871–1958), British tug of war competitor

See also
Meanings of minor planet names: 2001–3000#356